USS Theodore Roosevelt has been the name of more than one United States Navy ship, and may refer to:

, troop transport in commission from 1918 to 1919
, ballistic missile submarine in commission from 1961 to 1982
, aircraft carrier in commission since 1986

See also

United States Navy ship names